Miloslav Paunović (born 20 April 1938) is a Serbian boxer. He competed in the men's featherweight event at the 1960 Summer Olympics. At the 1960 Summer Olympics, he lost to Francesco Musso of Italy.

References

External links
 

1938 births
Living people
Serbian male boxers
Olympic boxers of Yugoslavia
Boxers at the 1960 Summer Olympics
Sportspeople from Belgrade
Featherweight boxers